The diamond turbot (Hypsopsetta guttulata) is a flatfish of the family Pleuronectidae. Its native habitat is the coastal areas of the eastern Pacific, from Cape Mendocino, California in the north to Baja California in Mexico in the south. The turbot is dark green with light blue spots.

Diet

The diamond turbot feeds almost entirely during daylight, and its diet consists of benthos invertebrates such as polychaetes, molluscs and shrimps.

References

Further reading

diamond turbot
Taxa named by Charles Frédéric Girard
diamond turbot
Taxobox binomials not recognized by IUCN